Linkabit was a technology company founded in 1968 by Irwin M. Jacobs, Andrew Viterbi and Leonard Kleinrock. Linkabit alumni have created a large number of technology companies, most notably, Qualcomm.

Linkabit is now a division of L3Harris Technologies and had been part of L-3 Communications, later named L3 Technologies, prior to its merger with Harris Corporation in July 2019.

Corporate history
Linkabit Corporation was formed in mid-1968 in Los Angeles by Irwin M. Jacobs, Andrew Viterbi and Leonard Kleinrock. Kleinrock soon left.

Linkabit was sold for $25 million to M/A-COM in 1979. The Linkabit operation continued under M/A-COM for the first part of the 1980s. VideoCipher, an analog scrambling system for television, was developed by the Linkabit works at M/A-COM in 1983. The first IETF meeting in January, 1986, was hosted by M/A-COM at its San Diego Linkabit facilities. However, Jacobs and Viterbi, who had stayed with M/A-COM following the sale, left in 1985, and by 1990 M/A-COM had sold off Linkabit piecemeal.

More than 75 direct or indirect Linkabit spinoff companies have been identified — a rate twice that of Fairchild Semiconductor, the legendary progenitor of Silicon Valley.

The best known Linkabit spinoff is Qualcomm, which was founded by Jacobs, Viterbi and five other Linkabit alumni in July 1985.

All three Linkabit founders have received National Medals for lifetime achievements.

References

Technology companies established in 1968
Defunct technology companies of the United States
Defunct companies based in Greater Los Angeles
1968 establishments in California
Technology companies disestablished in 1979
1979 disestablishments in California